Matias Laine (born 25 April 1990 in Joensuu) is a Finnish racing driver.

Career

Karting
Laine began his motorsport career in karting in 2003, finishing as runner-up in the Finnish Raket Cup Championship. In 2005 he won the Finnish Championship for the ICA Junior class.

Formula Renault
Laine began his formula racing career in the 2008 Formula Renault 2.0 UK Winter Cup season with CR Scuderia. He finished ninth in the championship with 50 points. He also completed two races of 2008 Portugal Winter Series FR2.0 at Estoril. Laine finished third and thirteenth in those races.

The following season, Laine competed in both the Formula Renault 2.0 UK and Eurocup Formula Renault 2.0 championships for CRS Racing and Motopark Academy respectively. He finished fourteenth in the UK standings, scoring points in each of the twelve races, before injury curtailed his season at Snetterton. In the Eurocup, he took 22nd place in the championship with six points that were earned in the second race at Silverstone Circuit.

Formula Three
2010 will see Laine move to the Formula 3 Euro Series, competing for Motopark Academy. He joined fellow Formula Renault graduates António Félix da Costa and Adrian Quaife-Hobbs at the team. He earned his first point finishing ninth at Hockenheim round because Esteban Gutiérrez who finished sixth was guest driver and was ineligible to scoring points.

GP3
Laine contested for the Marussia Manor Racing team in 2011 and eventually finished 31st. He was signed to MW Arden for the 2012 season where he scored his first points and then his first podium finish in the Spanish round. He won his first GP3 race at Spa Francorchamps, along with a final podium at Monza. He ended the season fifth and earned a drive for the 2013 Formula Renault 3.5 season with P1 Motorsport.

Racing record

Career summary

Complete Formula 3 Euro Series results
(key)

Complete GP3 Series results
(key) (Races in bold indicate pole position) (Races in italics indicate fastest lap)

Complete Formula Renault 3.5 Series results
(key) (Races in bold indicate pole position) (Races in italics indicate fastest lap)

References

External links
Official website
Laine career statistics at Driver Database

Finnish racing drivers
1990 births
People from Joensuu
Living people
British Formula Renault 2.0 drivers
Formula Renault Eurocup drivers
Portuguese Formula Renault 2.0 drivers
Formula 3 Euro Series drivers
Finnish GP3 Series drivers
World Series Formula V8 3.5 drivers
Manor Motorsport drivers
Arden International drivers
Sportspeople from North Karelia
CRS Racing drivers
P1 Motorsport drivers
Motopark Academy drivers
Strakka Racing drivers